Gwarighat railway station is a small railway station in Jabalpur district, Madhya Pradesh. Its code is GRG. It serves Jabalpur city. The station consists of two platforms, neither of which is well sheltered. It lacks many facilities including water and sanitation.

References

Railway stations in Jabalpur district
Transport in Jabalpur
Nagpur SEC railway division
Buildings and structures in Jabalpur